Concordia University Television (CUTV) is Canada's oldest student-run television station. CUTV was founded as TVSG (TV Sir George) in 1969 in the Montreal area on the campus of Concordia University. CUTV has a strong focus on media literacy and training. The station was under the umbrella of the Concordia Student Broadcasting Corporation (CSBC), along with CJLO and the Concordia Amateur Radio Club (CUARC, callsign VE2CUA).

Concordia University Television (CUTV) was a member owned and operated subsidiary of the non-profit corporation Concordia Student Broadcasting Society (CSBS) and whose primary purpose is to operate a TV station and video production facilities. CUTV distributes in-house, collaborative and external independent content through its closed-circuit TV network, DVD releases, internet-based distribution networks and Public-access television channels.

CUTV is a Campus/Community TV and video production studio that provides an essential service to those in the Concordia and Montreal communities whose needs are not met by mainstream commercial TV stations and video production facilities. CUTV also serves as a viable community resource by providing the space, equipment and know-how of video production to student and community populations that are interested in producing content that accurately represents them and their interests.

2012 Quebec student tuition boycott

CUTV gained visibility during the 2012 spring for its live coverage of protests held against Plan Nord, as well as protests held in the Greater Montreal area pertaining to the planned $1,625 tuition hike.

The station used a broadcast system that allowed them to send images live over the cellular phone network, allowing them to go to places that traditional television network news journalists could not go with their satellite trucks.  As well their images went out live, rather that delayed, and they offered an alternative perspective on the events.

References

External links 
  
 Concordia University Records Management and Archives: Concordia University Television fonds

Television stations in Montreal
Concordia University
Student television stations in Canada
1969 establishments in Quebec